Thamshavn Station is a former railway station on the Thamshavn Line, located at Thamshavn, a port area just northeast of the town of Orkanger in the municipality of Orkland in Trøndelag county, Norway. It is located along the present day European route E39 highway.

References

Orkland
Railway stations in Trøndelag
Railway stations on the Thamshavn Line
Railway stations opened in 1908
Railway stations closed in 1963
Disused railway stations in Norway
1908 establishments in Norway
1963 disestablishments in Norway